M'baye Gana Kébé (Thiès, 1936-Dakar, April 11, 2013) was a Senegalese French language writer.

He studied at the upper normal school and was a literature teacher.

Works 
 Ébéniques , 1975
 Le Blanc du nègre, 1979
 Colombes, 1979
 Ronde, 1979
 Le Décret, 1984
 Les lèvres bleues, 1984
 Le cri de notre sang, 1994
 Soldats de mes rêves, 1997
 Gorgui, 2003
 Tirailleurs en France, 2005
Capitaine N'Tchoréré, 2008
Une fresque pour Thiaroye, 2008

References and external links 

1936 births
2013 deaths
20th-century Senegalese writers
21st-century Senegalese writers
Senegalese writers in French